Kinfauns Parish Church is a Church of Scotland church in Kinfauns, Perth and Kinross, Scotland. Dating to 1869, the work of architect Andrew Heiton and John Murray Robertson, it is now a Category C listed building.

The ruined pre-Reformation church dates from the 15th century; however, it stands on the site of a chapel of Scone Abbey that existed as early as 1226.

Ministers
Robert Gordon (from 1816 to 1821)
Roger Davidson

Notable interments
The following people are buried in the church's kirkyard, which is also a listed structure:

Sir Denys Lowson, 1st Baronet (1906–1975)

Gallery

See also
List of listed buildings in Kinfauns, Perth and Kinross

References

External links

Category C listed buildings in Perth and Kinross
19th-century Church of Scotland church buildings
Churches completed in 1869
Churches in Perth and Kinross
Listed churches in Scotland